Field Marshal John Standish Surtees Prendergast Vereker, 6th Viscount Gort,  (10 July 1886 – 31 March 1946) was a senior British Army officer. As a young officer during the First World War, he was decorated with the Victoria Cross for his actions during the Battle of the Canal du Nord. During the 1930s he served as Chief of the Imperial General Staff (the professional head of the British Army). He is best known for commanding the British Expeditionary Force that was sent to France in the first year of the Second World War, only to be evacuated from Dunkirk the following year. Gort later served as Governor of Gibraltar and Malta, and High Commissioner for Palestine and Transjordan.

Early life and family
Vereker was born in London. His mother was Eleanor, Viscountess Gort née Surtees (1857–1933; later Eleanor Benson), who was a daughter of the writer Robert Smith Surtees. Vereker's father was John Gage Prendergast Vereker, 5th Viscount Gort (1849–1902).

J. S. S. P. Vereker grew up in County Durham and the Isle of Wight. He was educated at Malvern Link Preparatory School, Harrow School, 
and entered the Royal Military College, Sandhurst in January 1904. As Viscount Gort, he was commissioned as a second lieutenant in the Grenadier Guards on 16 August 1905, and promoted to lieutenant on 1 April 1907.

In November 1908, Gort visited his uncle, Jeffrey Edward Prendergast Vereker, a retired British army major, who was living in Canada, at Kenora, Ontario. During a moose hunting trip, Gort slipped off a large boulder, causing his rifle to discharge; the bullet injured a local guide, William Prettie, who later died of his wound in Winnipeg. Gort returned immediately to England. While studying at Trinity College, Cambridge he was initiated into Isaac Newton University Lodge.

Gort commanded the detachment of Grenadier Guards that bore the coffin at the funeral of King Edward VII in May 1910. He was made a Member of the Royal Victorian Order for his services in that role.

On 22 February 1911, Gort married Corinna Katherine Vereker, his second cousin; the couple had two sons and a daughter, before divorcing (1925). Their elder son, Charles Standish Vereker, was born on 23 February 1912, and served as a lieutenant with the Grenadier Guards, before committing suicide (26 February 1941). A second son, Jocelyn Cecil Vereker, was born on 27 July 1913, but died before his second birthday. Gort's daughter, Jacqueline Corinne Yvonne Vereker, who was born on 20 October 1914, married (June 1940) The Honourable William Sidney, later the 1st Viscount De L'Isle.

First World War
On 5 August 1914, Gort was promoted to captain. He went to France with the British Expeditionary Force and fought on the Western Front, taking part in the retreat from Mons in August 1914. He became a staff officer with the First Army in December 1914 and then became Brigade Major of the 4th (Guards) Brigade in April 1915. He was awarded the Military Cross in June 1915. Promoted to the brevet rank of major in June 1916, he became a staff officer at the Headquarters of the British Expeditionary Force and fought at the Battle of the Somme throughout the autumn of 1916. He was given the acting rank of lieutenant-colonel in April 1917 on appointment as Commanding Officer of 4th Battalion Grenadier Guards and, having been awarded the Distinguished Service Order (DSO) in June 1917, he led his battalion at the Battle of Passchendaele, earning a Bar to his DSO in September 1917. The bar's citation reads:

On 27 November 1918, sixteen days after the war came to an end, Gort was awarded the Victoria Cross, the highest award for gallantry in the face of the enemy that can be awarded to British and Commonwealth forces, for his actions on 27 September 1918 at the Battle of the Canal du Nord, near Flesquieres, France.

Victoria Cross citation

Subsequent to this he became known as "Tiger" Gort. He won a second Bar to his DSO in January 1919, with the citation reading:

He was also mentioned in despatches eight times during the war.

Inter-war years
Gort was promoted to the substantive rank of major on 21 October 1919. After attending a short course at the Staff College, Camberley, in 1919 he joined Headquarters London District and, having been promoted to brevet lieutenant-colonel on 1 January 1921, he returned to the College as an instructor. He left the Staff College in May 1923.

Gort was promoted to colonel in April 1926 (with seniority backdated to 1 January 1925). In 1926 he became a staff officer at London District before becoming a chief instructor at the Senior Officers' School at Sheerness. In January 1927, he went to Shanghai, returning in August to give a first-hand account of the Chinese situation to the King and the Prince of Wales. He returned home to be a staff officer at Headquarters 4th Infantry Division at Colchester in July 1927.

In June 1928, Gort was appointed a Commander of the Order of the British Empire. He went on to command the Guards Brigade for two years from 1930 before overseeing training in India with the temporary rank of brigadier. In 1932, he took up flying, buying the de Havilland Moth aircraft Henrietta and being elected chairman of the Household Brigade Flying Club. On 25 November 1935, he was promoted to major-general. He returned to the Staff College, Camberley in 1936 as Commandant.

In May 1937, Gort was appointed a Companion of the Order of the Bath. In September 1937, he became Military Secretary to the War Minister, Leslie Hore-Belisha, with the temporary rank of lieutenant-general. On 6 December 1937, as part of a purge by Hore-Belisha of senior officers, Gort was appointed to the Army Council, made a general and replaced Field Marshal Sir Cyril Deverell as Chief of the Imperial General Staff. On 1 January 1938, he was made a Knight Commander of the Order of the Bath.

As Chief of the Imperial General Staff, Gort advocated the primacy of building a land army and defending France and the Low Countries over Imperial defence after France had said she would not be able on her own to defend herself against a German attack.

On 2 December 1938 Gort submitted a report on the readiness of the British Army. He observed that Nazi Germany, as a result of the acquisition of Czechoslovakia, was in a stronger position than the previous year and that as a result of the government's decision in 1937 to create a "general purpose" army, Britain lacked the necessary forces for the defence of France.

On 21 December Gort recommended to the Chiefs of Staff that Britain would need to help France defend the Netherlands and Belgium and that for that purpose the British Army needed complete equipment for four Regular army infantry divisions and two mobile armoured divisions, with the Territorial army armed with training equipment and then war equipment for four divisions. The First Sea Lord, Admiral Sir Roger Backhouse, replied that Britain's continental commitment might not be a limited liability. Gort replied: "Lord Kitchener had clearly pointed out that no great country can wage a 'little' war". He also attacked as a fallacy the theory of strategic mobility by the use of seapower because in modern war land transport was faster and cheaper than transport by sea. The experience of David Lloyd George's 1917 Alexandretta project "proved that [maritime side-shows] invariably led to vast commitments out of all proportion to the value of the object attained". If a purely defensive position was taken the Maginot Line would be broken, and the British Army (with anti-aircraft defence) was only getting £277 million out of a total £2,000 million spent on defence.

Second World War

On the outbreak of the Second World War, Gort was appointed by Prime Minister Neville Chamberlain as the Commander-in-Chief of the British Expeditionary Force (BEF) in France, arriving there on 19 September 1939.

During this time Gort played a part in a political manoeuvre, the Pillbox affair, that led to the dismissal of War Minister Leslie Hore-Belisha. Unimpressed by his qualities for command, Hore-Belisha described Gort as: "utterly brainless and unable to grasp the simplest problem". Gort dismissed his subordinates' critiques of the Allies' Plan D, including his former friend Alan Brooke's correct prediction that it would allow the Wehrmacht to outflank the Allied forces, as defeatist. 

Following the period of the "Phoney War", the Wehrmachts attack and breakthrough in the Ardennes in May 1940 succeeded in splitting the Allied Armies, and surrounding the French First Army and BEF, Gort took the unilateral decision to abandon his orders received from the British Government for a southward attack to be made to support the French Army, instead on 25 May 1940 ordering a retreat by the BEF northwards to the French coast. On reaching the coast Gort oversaw the en masse retirement of the BEF back to the British Isles, involving the Battle of Dunkirk and the Dunkirk evacuation, while France was defeated and surrendered to Nazi Germany four weeks later.

With regard to his conduct as C.-in-C. in France in 1940, Gort is credited by some historians as reacting efficiently to the crisis and saving the BEF, while others hold a more critical view of his leadership, seeing his decision to abandon France during Germany's attack into the west as defeatist.

Gort went on to serve in various positions for the remainder of the war, but the chaotic rout of the BEF under his command from France had convinced Winston Churchill, the newly installed British Prime Minister, that he was an undesirable as a British Army General Staff field commander, and he was side-lined to non-combatant posts. On the day of his return to England from France on 1 June 1940 he was appointed an ADC General to George VI. On 25 June 1940 he went by flying boat, with Duff Cooper, to Rabat, Morocco, to rally anti-Nazi French cabinet ministers, but was instead held on his flying boat. He quickly returned to Britain.

Gort was given the post of Inspector of Training and the Home Guard, and with nothing constructive to do visited Iceland, Orkney and Shetland.  He went on to serve as Governor of Gibraltar (1941–42). In 1943 he succeeded Lord Galway as Colonel Commandant of the Honourable Artillery Company, a position he held until his death.

As Governor of Malta (1942–44), Gort's courage and leadership during the siege was recognised by the Maltese giving him the Sword of Honour. He pushed ahead with extending the airfield into land reclaimed from the sea, against the advice of the British government, but was later thanked by the War Cabinet for his foresight when the airfield proved vital to the British Mediterranean campaign. The King gave Gort his field marshal's baton on 20 June 1943 at Malta.  On 29 September, Gort, together with Generals Dwight D. Eisenhower and Harold Alexander, witnessed Marshal Pietro Badoglio signing the Italian surrender in Valletta harbour.

Gort was present when his son-in-law, Major William Sidney, received the Victoria Cross from General Sir Harold Alexander, Commander-in-Chief (C-in-C) of the Allied Armies in Italy, on 3 March 1944 in Italy.

Gort ended the war as High Commissioner for Palestine and Transjordan. He served in this office for only one year. In 1945 he nominated William James Fitzgerald, Chief Justice of Palestine, to enquire into the Jewish-Arab conflict in Jerusalem. Chief Justice Fitzgerald issued his report in which he proposed to divide the city into separate Jewish and Arab Quarters. Despite growing tensions in Palestine, Gort strove to cultivate good personal relations with both Jews and Arabs, and was greatly admired and respected by the Jewish and Arab communities.

During his time in Palestine, Gort's health deteriorated, and he was suffering from great pain and discomfort in his abdomen. He was in fact suffering from liver cancer, but the doctors he consulted in London were unable to properly diagnose his condition. Gort ruled Palestine at the time that the Jewish insurgency was beginning. Despite his efforts, he was unable to stem the growing confrontation between the Yishuv (Jewish community) and British authorities. On 5 November 1945, he stepped down as High Commissioner and returned to Britain. Commenting on his departure, The Palestine Post wrote that "No High Commissioner in the twenty-five years of British rule in Palestine enjoyed greater popular trust and none repaid it with greater personal kindness."

Death
After leaving Palestine and returning to England, Gort was admitted to Guy's Hospital in London, where exploratory surgery revealed that he was dying from inoperable liver cancer. In February 1946 he was created a Viscount in the Peerage of the United Kingdom under the same title as his existing Viscountcy in the Peerage of Ireland. On 31 March 1946, he died in Guy's Hospital at the age of 59 years. As he did not have a surviving son, the Irish Viscountcy of Gort passed to his brother, Standish Vereker, and the British creation became extinct. His body was entombed in the Sidney family vault at St. John the Baptist Church, Penshurst, in the county of Kent.

Film portrayal
Gort was portrayed by Cyril Raymond in the film Dunkirk (1958).

References

Bibliography

Further reading

External links

British Army Officers 1939−1945

 Location of grave and VC medal (Kent)
 Memorial to Lord Gort in the Sidney Chapel at St John the Baptist, Penshurst
Generals of World War II
 

|-

|-

|-

 
|-

|-

|-

1886 births
1946 deaths
People educated at Harrow School
Graduates of the Royal Military College, Sandhurst
British World War I recipients of the Victoria Cross
British field marshals of World War II
British Army personnel of World War I
Deaths from cancer in England
Deaths from liver cancer
English people of Dutch descent
English people of Irish descent
Governors of Gibraltar
Grenadier Guards officers
British High Commissioners of Palestine
Commanders of the Order of the British Empire
Knights Grand Cross of the Order of the Bath
Members of the Royal Victorian Order
Knights of the Order of St John
Recipients of the Military Cross
Diplomatic peers
Governors and Governors-General of Malta
Companions of the Distinguished Service Order
Chiefs of the Imperial General Staff
British Army recipients of the Victoria Cross
Schuyler family
Van Cortlandt family
Mandatory Palestine people of World War II
War Office personnel in World War II
Graduates of the Staff College, Camberley
British military personnel of the Palestine Emergency
Commandants of the Staff College, Camberley
British Freemasons
Members of Isaac Newton University Lodge
Viscounts created by George VI
People from Westminster
Military personnel from Middlesex
Burials in Kent
Academics of the Staff College, Camberley